Michel Robert is the name of:

 J. J. Michel Robert (born 1938), Quebec jurist and former Canadian politician
 Michel Robert (equestrian) (born 1948), French show jumping rider

See also
 Robert H. Michel (1923–2017), American politician